The surname Van Rensselaer is of Dutch origin, more specifically Flemish. Van is a Dutch preposition meaning from and is a common prefix in Dutch language surnames. In Dutch, "van" is written with a lower case "v"; in the United States the particle "Van" is usually capitalized, but individual usage should be followed.

List of people with the surname Van Rensselaer
Alexander Van Rensselaer (1850–1933), tennis player
Charles W. van Rensselaer (1823–1857), first officer on the  SS Central America
Cortlandt Van Rensselaer (1808–1860), Presbyterian clergyman.
Hendrick van Rensselaer (1667–1740)
Henry Bell Van Rensselaer (1810–1864), US Representative from New York, and Union Army general
Henry K. Van Rensselaer (1744–1816), General in the American Revolution
Jacob R. Van Rensselaer (1767–1835)
James van Rensselaer (military figure) (1747-1827)
James Van Rensselaer (1783-March 12, 1847), founder of Rensselaer, Indiana
Jan Baptist van Rensselaer (1629–1678), third patroon of the Manor of Rensselaerswyck
Jeremiah Van Rensselaer (1738–1810), US Representative from New York, and Lt. Gov. of New York 
Jeremias van Rensselaer (1632–1674), Director of Rensselaerwyck
Jeremias Van Rensselaer (sixth patroon) (1705–1745), sixth patroon of the Manor of Rensselaerswyck
Johan van Rensselaer (1625–1663), second patroon of the Manor of Rensselaerswyck
John Sanders Van Rensselaer (1792–1868), lawyer and soldier
Kiliaen van Rensselaer (fourth patroon) (d. 1687), fourth patroon of the Manor of Rensselaerswyck
Kiliaen Van Rensselaer (fifth patroon) (1663–1719), fifth patroon of the Manor of Rensselaerswyck
Kiliaen van Rensselaer (merchant) (1586–1643), one of the founders and directors of the Dutch West India Company
Kiliaen van Rensselaer (colonel) (1717–1781), Colonel in the American Revolution
Killian K. Van Rensselaer (1763–1845), US Representative from New York
Margarita "Peggy" Schuyler Van Rensselaer (1758–1801), daughter of Gen. Philip Schuyler and wife of Stephen Van Rensselaer III
Mariana Alley Griswold Van Rensselaer (1851–1934), critic, author
Martha Van Rensselaer (1864–1932), founding director of  Cornell University’s New York State College of Home Economics (now the New York State College of Human Ecology)
 Rev. Dr. Maunsell Van Rensselaer (1819-1900), first president of Deveaux College
Nicholas Van Rensselaer (military figure) (1754–1848), Colonel in the Revolutionary War
Nicholas van Rensselaer (minister) (1636-1678), New York Reformed Church clergy
Philip Kiliaen van Rensselaer (1747–1798), storekeeper, military storekeeper and Commissary for the Northern Department
Philip S. Van Rensselaer (1767–1824), Mayor of Albany, New York
Robert Van Rensselaer (1740–1802), Brigadier General in  American Revolution, New York politician
Solomon Van Rensselaer (1774–1852), US Representative from New York
Stephen van Rensselaer I (1707–1747), seventh Patroon and fourth Lord of the Manor
Stephen van Rensselaer II (1742–1769), eighth Patroon and fifth Lord of the Manor
Stephen Van Rensselaer III (1764–1839), ninth Patroon and sixth Lord of the Manor
Stephen Van Rensselaer IV (1789–1868), tenth and last Patroon and seventh and last Lord of the Manor

See also
Van Rensselaer (family)

References

Surnames of Dutch origin